The Wages of Destruction is a non-fiction book detailing the economic history of Nazi Germany. Written by Adam Tooze, it was first published by Allen Lane in 2006.

The Wages of Destruction won the Wolfson History Prize and the 2007 Longman/History Today Book of the Year Prize. It was published to critical praise from such authors as Michael Burleigh, Richard Overy and Niall Ferguson.

In the book, Tooze writes that after the Germans had failed to defeat Britain in 1940, the economic logic of the war drove them to an invasion of the Soviet Union. Hitler was constrained to do so in 1941 in order to obtain the natural resources necessary to challenge two economic superpowers: the United States and the British Empire. That sealed the fate of the Third Reich because it was resource constraints that made victory against the Soviet Union impossible, while the Soviets received supplies from the Americans and the British to supplement the resources that remained under their control.

The book makes the case for the economic impact of the British and then Anglo-American strategic bombing campaigns, but it argues that the wrong targets were often selected. The book also challenges the idea of an armaments miracle under Albert Speer, and rejects the idea that the Nazi economy could have mobilised significantly more women for the war economy.

Reception
The book was positively reviewed by History Today, which called it "an extraordinary achievement":

References

External links
 The Wages of Destruction: The Making and Breaking of the Nazi Economy at Archive.org
 Material connected to A. Tooze, Wages of Destruction (London, 2006) at the University of Cambridge.

Books about economic history
History books about Nazi Germany
2006 non-fiction books
British books
21st-century history books